Pseudoeurycea tenchalli, commonly known as the bearded salamander, is a species of salamander in the family Plethodontidae. It is endemic to Cerro Teotepec (Sierra Madre del Sur) in Guerrero state, Mexico.

Pseudoeurycea tenchalli is terrestrial salamander that lives in pine–oak forests (altitude about  asl), hiding in logs and other debris. There is some logging in its remote but small distribution area that constitutes a threat to this little-known species.

References

Pseudoeurycea
Endemic amphibians of Mexico
Fauna of the Sierra Madre del Sur
Amphibians described in 1996
Taxonomy articles created by Polbot